The Putian people or Xinghua people, (Chinese: 莆田人, pinyin: Pútiánrén; Puxian Min: 莆仙儂,) are people from Putian, east Fujian, China.  They are also known as Xinghua or Henghua people after the historical name of the area. They speak Min Chinese called Puxian Min.

They may also be referred to as Xinghua. Hing Hua district was one former name of Putian. Henghuas are speakers of Putianese and trace their ancestry to Putian. Today, there are Henghua diaspora communities at Thailand, Hong Kong, Vietnam, Malaysia, Singapore, Australia and Indonesia.

Culture
Putian people eat Putian cuisine, a style of Fujian cuisine known for its emphasis on fresh seafood.

Notable people
 Lin Moniang: also known as Mazu, Chinese Goddess of Sea
 Cai Xiang (1012–1067): Chinese calligrapher, poet, scholar and official
 Chen Wenlong (1232–1277): Scholarly General during the final years of the Southern Song Dynasty, was later deified as City God of Fuzhou and Putian during the Ming Dynasty
 Jianqing Fan (1962-): Statistician, financial econometrician, Professor of Finance, a Professor of Statistics, a Chairman of Department of Operations Research and Finance
 Ng Teng Fong: Singaporean real estate tycoon
 Dato Sri Tahir or Ang Tjoen Ming: Founder and CEO, Mayapada Group, Indonesia
 Mochtar Riady: Founder, Lippo Group, Indonesia
 Sukanto Tanoto: Founder, Raja Garuda Mas International (now Royal Golden Eagle), Indonesia
 James Riady: Son of Mochtar Riady; Deputy chairman, Lippo Group, Indonesia
Moses Lim, Singapore comedian and actor
Liem Swie King (born 28 February 1956 in Kudus) a former Indonesian badminton player, once one of the top players in the world 
Ng Eng Hen, Minister of Defence (Singapore).
 Che Yin Wong (1959−): Businessman and philanthropist, Hong Kong; Founder and chairman of Kong Fung International Group.
 Theresa Fu (1984-): Hong Kong singer and actress.
 Fong Chi Chung: founder of Singapore-based restaurant chain Putien.
 John Sung: evangelist

See also 
 Fuzhou people
 Hoklo people
 Pu-Xian Min

References 

Ethnic groups in China
Ethnic groups in Fujian
Ethnic groups in Malaysia
Putian